Games Unplugged was an American magazine dedicated to the adventure tabletop gaming industry. The bimonthly magazine, headquartered in Lake Geneva, Wisconsin, ran for 34 issues, from June 2000 until May 2004. The company also had a website, GamesUnplugged.com, which is now defunct.

Content
It featured news, products, designers and their companies, and upcoming releases of non-electronic role-playing games, card games, board games, and miniature wargames.

The magazine is most notable for running as a regular feature the most recent appearance of Larry Elmore's popular comic strip SnarfQuest. The magazine also featured writing by Margaret Weis on occasion.

Publication history
After running Archangel Entertainment, Ken Whitman next worked with Dynasty Presentations, in particular the new magazine Games Unplugged. Timothy Brown, James Ward, Lester W. Smith, John Danovich, and Sean Everette founded the d20 company Fast Forward Entertainment, which subsequently took over publication of Games Unplugged.

References

Bimonthly magazines published in the United States
Card game magazines
Defunct magazines published in the United States
Dungeons & Dragons magazines
Magazines established in 2000
Magazines disestablished in 2004
Magazines published in Wisconsin
Role-playing game magazines
Lake Geneva, Wisconsin
Wargaming magazines
Wizards of the Coast magazines